"South Bronx" is a song by American hip hop group Boogie Down Productions, released as the lead single from their debut studio album Criminal Minded (1987). The song’s title references New York City’s South Bronx area and is the representative anthem of the titular inner-city.

The song was produced by DJ Scott La Rock and KRS-One. The song serves as a diss track aimed at MC Shan in response to his song "The Bridge", and is part of what became known as The Bridge Wars.

History
KRS-one reports that DJ Red Alert played this song three times in a row and that the crowd was very engaged. The song had an influence on the new jack swing genre.

Composition
The song samples "Get Up Offa That Thing" and does so through the use of a sampler, where the horn bar is available in several different pitches. Eleven different pitches are used throughout the recording including the actual one, 7 of which were used altogether to create a threatening effect. The first is an interpolation of Public Enemy's "Rebel Without a Pause". The two other samples are "Funky Drummer" and "Get Up, Get Into It, Get Involved".

References

External links
 Boogie Down Productions at Discogs.com

1986 songs
KRS-One songs
Answer songs
Songs written by KRS-One
Diss tracks
Songs about New York City
Songs written by Scott La Rock